Women's rugby league is a popular women's sports in Australia. The sport has a high level of participation in the country both recreational and professional. Australian Rugby League Commission (ARLC) is the national governing body of the sport in Australia, organising the Australian Women's Rugby League, the Australian women's national team, and the nine state governing bodies of the game, among other duties. Women's participation of modern rugby league has been recorded since the early 1920s. It has since become one of Australia's most popular women's team sports.

History

1920s
The first Women's Rugby League match in Australia was played in Sydney, on Saturday, 17 September 1921. Players, who had been training in the preceding months, had been divided into two teams, named Metropolitan (who played in blue jerseys) and Sydney (who played in maroon jerseys). Metropolitan won the match 21–11. A second 'return' match was played the following Saturday, 24 September 1921. Three matches were held in 1922 in April, August and October. The organisation was disbanded prior to the 1923 season.

1970s
In the mid-1970s Women's Rugby League teams were organised in Perth, including South Perth and Cottesloe.

In 1976, a Women's Rugby League team from Manurewa in Auckland, New Zealand toured Australia. The Manurewa club had earlier received junior boys teams from Goulburn and Lalor Park, Sydney and these two clubs offered to host a visit from Manurewa's ladies team. A women's team was formed in Goulburn to play against the tourists. They played two matches, one in Goulburn and another at Endeavour Field in Cronulla. The Lalor Park team had played and won four local matches prior to their match against Manurewa.

1990s
In the early part of the 1990s Women's Rugby League competitions were run in Sydney, the Illawarra and the Australian Capital Territory. Some of the clubs from those regions participated in an annual knock-out competition. The East Canberra club won this knock-out tournament in three consecutive years: 1991, 1992 and 1993. Other participating clubs included the Albion Park Outlaws, Calwell Colts, North Sydney, Northern Districts Illawarra, Warilla Warriors, Woden Valley and the Wollongong Wildcats. In the final of the 1994 tournament, Picton defected Bulli.

In 1995, Australia hosted a tour by the New Zealand national team. This was the inaugural series of Test Matches for both countries in Women's Rugby League. Tour matches were played in Sydney, Canberra and Brisbane.

In 1996, Australia hosted a seven match, three Test tour by the Great Britain women's national rugby league team. Australia claimed their inaugural international win in the First Test in Canberra. Great Britain, however, won the Second Test in Brisbane and the Third Test at Redfern Oval in Sydney to claim a series victory.

The Australian national team toured New Zealand in 1997 (both matches lost) and Fiji in 1998 (both matches won). Hosting duties for a Test Match series in 1999 were shared with New Zealand with games played at Leichhardt Oval and Penrith Stadium in Sydney and the third and final match played in Auckland. Australia beat New Zealand for the first time in the Second Test at Penrith, but the Kiwi Ferns won the series, 2–1.

The women's game in Queensland expanded from Brisbane and Ipswich in 1998 when a competition commenced in Mackay. Souths beat the previously undefeated Norths in the Grand Final.

During the later years of the 1990s National Championships were conducted with representative, rather than club, teams participating. In 1997, Illawarra beat Brisbane in the final. The 1998 tournament was held at Pizzey Park, Burleigh Heads and included teams from Sydney, Canberra, Illawarra, Brisbane, Ipswich and for the first time Western Australia. The 1999 tournament was reconfigured to have four state/territory teams. New South Wales beat Queensland in the final, ahead of Western Australia and the Australian Capital Territory.

The year 1999 saw the introduction of an interstate series between Queensland and New South Wales. The teams play for the Nellie Doherty Cup. Although this ongoing series was occasionally referred to in the media as the Women's State of Origin the respective teams were selected on a residential basis until 2017. Queensland won this augural match, 16–14.

2000s
Australia participated in the inaugural Women's Rugby League World Cup in November 2000, playing two matches each against Great Britain & Ireland and New Zealand. The Australian squad comprised players from the Australian Capital Territory, New South Wales, Queensland and Western Australia.

National Championships were held at Belmont, Western Australia in 2000, Rooty Hill, New South Wales in 2001, Ipswich, Queensland in 2002, West Belconnen, Australian Capital Territory in 2003, Runaway Bay, Queensland in 2005, and Queanbeyan, New South Wales in 2006. Queensland won the tournament in 2000 and 2001. In 2003, Queensland Whites defeated Queensland Maroons in the final, ahead of ACT and NSW teams. The tournament was not held in 2004. In 2005, South East Queensland beat a Queensland Barbarians team in the final, ahead of NSW City and NSW Country teams. in 2006, Brisbane beat Sydney Metro in the final, ahead of NSW Country Monaro and NSW Country Southern Division teams.

The 2008 Women's Rugby League World Cup was the first held in Australia from 26 October, culminating in the final between Australian Jillaroos and the Kiwi Ferns on 22 November. It was held at Stockland Park alongside the Police World Cup. Eight teams took part including defending champions New Zealand.

2010s
The 2011 All Stars match included the first Women's All Stars exhibition match which was won by the NRL Women's All Stars 22–6.

In 2016 the first local derby by NRL clubs was played Cronulla-Sutherland Sharks and St. George Illawarra Dragons had a Women's rugby league nines match at Southern Cross Group Stadium which aired on Fox Sports it was a curtain-raiser for the main game Sharks won 16–12.

The New South Wales Rugby League announced the creation of a nine-a-side under-18s women's league for 2017 Named the Tarsha Gale Nines after the former Australian Jillaroos and NSW captain of the 1990s.

For the first time in the sport's history the 2017 Women's Rugby League World Cup was held concurrently with the men's tournament.

On 14 May 2017 the first Women's City vs Country Origin game was played.

National Championships 
The Women's Rugby League Australian National Championships have continually evolved since their establishment in the early 1990s. The tournament was initially for club sides, with the ability of the players to self-fund their travel to the tournament being a factor in the number of teams participating. 1994 saw a change to regional representative teams. In 2018 and 2019 the tournament featured the best Australian-based players in the women's game. With the advent and success of the NRL Women's Premiership NRLW, the tournament was revised to have a development focus on emerging talent.

Participation
no information
no information

Competitions
NRL Women's Premiership
Australian Women's Rugby League
Brisbane and District Women's Rugby League
Sydney Metropolitan Women's Rugby League

See also

Rugby league in Australia
Women's rugby league
NRL Women's Premiership – the official league for women's rugby league in Australia starting in 2018

References

External links